Hedblom Glacier is a glacier between Mount Creak and Tito Peak that flows east from Endeavour Massif to Tripp Ice Tongue, Victoria Land, Antarctica. It was named after Captain E.E. Hedblom, U.S. Navy, Medical Officer of Task Force 43 in the Ross Sea area during Operation Deep Freeze I, 1955–56.

References

Glaciers of Victoria Land
Scott Coast